James Claypoole, Sr. (January 22, 1720/21September 21, 1784) was an American portrait painter, house painter and glazier. He was born in Philadelphia, Pennsylvania, the son of Joseph Claypoole (1677-1740/41) and his second wife Edith Ward Claypoole (b. ?-d. 1737). He died in Philadelphia.

Artistic training and works

In 1741 he was still apprenticed to Gustavus Hesselius (1682–1755), a Swedish born painter who resided in Philadelphia. 
It is probable that he painted the portraits of his brother, George Claypoole Sr. (1706-c1770) and sister-in-law, Hannah Claypoole (ca 1708–1745), as the portraits were in the household of George Claypoole, Sr., joiner and cabinetmaker, also shop keeper, Front Street, Philadelphia, Pa. Ca 1770 – portraits inherited by George and Hannah Claypoole's eldest son, George Claypoole Jr., (1733–1793), joiner and cabinet maker, of 65 Walnut Street, Philadelphia, Pa. Ca 1793 – portraits inherited by George Jr. and Mary (Parkhouse) Claypoole’s eldest and surviving son, Dr. Willam Claypoole, (1758–1797) of Wilmington, North Carolina. 1797 – portraits inherited by William and Mary (Wright) Claypoole’s only surviving child, Ann Grainger Claypoole, (ca 1791–1832) of Wilmington, North Carolina. Owned since 1984 by the Colonial Dames of Wilmington, North Carolina.

He had two early students that went on to become well known artists: James Claypoole, Jr. (ca 1743–1822), and Matthew Pratt (1734–1805).

He served as High Sheriff of Philadelphia from 1777–1780.

Commissioned and paid $8 by Captain Abram Markoe in 1775 to paint a flag for the Philadelphia Troop of Light Horse.

Marriages and children

He married Rebecca White (1721–1749) on May 24, 1742 at Christ Church, Philadelphia.  He had three children from this marriage:  
  James Claypoole Jr., (1743–1822); 
  Joseph Claypoole (1745-?); and, 
  Mary Claypoole, (1746–1746).

After Rebecca's death on July 19, 1749 he married Mary Chambers (d. 1796) in September 1750 and had nine children with her: 
  Elizabeth Claypoole Copper Matlack, (1751-ca 1820); She first married Norris Copper and second Timothy Matlack
  Mary Claypoole Peale (1753–1829); married James Peale younger brother to Charles Willson Peale
  Abraham George Claypoole, (1754–1827); 
  David Chambers Claypoole, (1757–1849); 
  Temperance Claypoole, (1759-1815); 
  Helen Claypoole (?-?); 
  Rebecca Claypoole, (?-?); 
  Hester Claypoole Allen, (1763-?); and, she married Joseph Allen
  Septimus Claypoole, (1764–1798).

He was father-in-law to both the miniature portraitist James Peale and  Col. Timothy Matlack (1730–1829), a Free Quaker, merchant, surveyor, architect, statesman, and patriot in the American Revolution.

Death
He died on September 21, 1784 in Philadelphia, Pennsylvania and is interred at Old Saint Pauls Episcopal Church Cemetery, in Philadelphia, Pennsylvania.

A portrait of James Claypoole Sr. by James Peale and/or Charles Willson Peale is in the Pennsylvania Academy of the Fine Arts, Philadelphia, Pennsylvania.

References

1720 births
1784 deaths
Artists from Philadelphia
People of colonial Pennsylvania
18th-century American painters
18th-century American male artists
American male painters
American portrait painters
Burials in Pennsylvania